Star Trek: Picard is an American television series created by Akiva Goldsman, Michael Chabon, Kirsten Beyer, and Alex Kurtzman for the streaming service CBS All Access (later rebranded as Paramount+). It is the eighth Star Trek series and debuted in 2020 as part of Kurtzman's expanded Star Trek Universe. The series features the retired Starfleet admiral Jean-Luc Picard, beginning 20 years after his last appearance in Star Trek: Nemesis (2002). Each season explores different aspects of the character in his old age.

Patrick Stewart stars as Picard, reprising his role from the series Star Trek: The Next Generation as well as other Star Trek media. Alison Pill, Isa Briones, Harry Treadaway, Michelle Hurd, Santiago Cabrera, and Evan Evagora also star in the first season, with Jeri Ryan, Orla Brady, and Brent Spiner joining for the second. The third season stars Stewart, Ryan, Hurd, and Ed Speleers, with Next Generation cast members LeVar Burton, Michael Dorn, Jonathan Frakes, Gates McFadden, Marina Sirtis, and Spiner as special guest stars.

The series was first rumored in June 2018 and was officially announced that August. It is produced by CBS Studios in association with Secret Hideout, Weed Road Pictures, and Roddenberry Entertainment, and was designed to be slower and more character-focused than previous series in the franchise. Filming took place in California, which granted the series large tax credits. Chabon served as showrunner for the first season, with Goldsman and Terry Matalas taking over for the second which was filmed back-to-back with the third. Matalas became the sole showrunner for the third season, which was designed to be a conclusion to the stories of Picard and the other Next Generation cast members.

Star Trek: Picard premiered on CBS All Access on January 23, 2020, and its first season ran for 10 episodes until March 26. The second season was released on Paramount+ from March 3 to May 5, 2022, and the third and final season is being released from February 16 to April 20, 2023. The series was met with generally positive reviews from critics, and has received numerous accolades including a Primetime Emmy Award for its prosthetic makeup. Several tie-in projects have been created based on the series, including an episode of the companion series Star Trek: Short Treks. Cast and crew also expressed interest in a spin-off or continuation of the series after the third season.

Premise
The series begins in 2399, 20 years after Jean-Luc Picard's last appearance in Star Trek: Nemesis (2002), and finds the character deeply affected by the death of Data in that film as well as the destruction of the planet Romulus in the film Star Trek (2009). Retired from Starfleet and living on his family's vineyard, Picard is drawn into a new adventure when he is visited by an apparent daughter of Data, one of several new synthetic beings, or "synths". Picard fights for their right to exist and gives his life to save them.

After Picard's consciousness is transferred into a synthetic body, the second season moves forward to 2401. Picard and his companions are living new lives when they are faced with his old adversary Q in the ultimate trial: Q traps them in an alternate reality and they must travel back in time to the 21st century to save the future of the galaxy. In the third season, a mysterious new enemy begins hunting Picard's former command crew of the USS Enterprise. He unites with old and new allies for a final mission.

Episodes

Season 1 (2020)

Season 2 (2022)

Season 3 (2023)

Cast and characters

 Patrick Stewart as Jean-Luc Picard: a former Starfleet admiral who previously commanded the USS Enterprise. Picard retired from Starfleet in protest when the Federation chose not to aid the Romulans when their planet was destroyed. He is diagnosed with a terminal illness in the first season, as the writers wanted to discuss relatable issues that people face at the end of their lives, and he dies at the end of the season. Picard's consciousness is transferred to a synthetic body, which led to widespread discussion by fans and critics regarding whether the synthetic version was still the same person. Co-creators Michael Chabon and Akiva Goldsman both felt he was the same character, but other commentators disagreed. More than a week of debates on the Star Trek wiki encyclopaedia Memory Alpha regarding whether or not a new wiki page should be created for the synthetic version of Picard ended with the information being kept on the same page. By the second season, Picard has been appointed Chancellor of Starfleet Academy. The season explores Picard's trauma from his mother's death by suicide when Picard was a child, inspired by Stewart's own experience of childhood domestic violence. In the third and final season he is reunited with the former command crew of the Enterprise.
 Alison Pill as Agnes Jurati (seasons 1–2): a former Starfleet doctor and expert on synthetic life who joins Picard. During the second season, Agnes is assimilated into the Borg Collective and becomes the new Borg Queen.
 Isa Briones as Dahj and Soji Asha, Sutra, and Kore Soong (seasons 1–2): Dahj and Soji are twin androids with organic bodies that were created to be the daughters of Data. Sutra is an earlier android model, and Kore is the daughter of Dr. Adam Soong from 2024. This helps explain by whom Data was inspired for the appearance of Dahj and Soji.
 Harry Treadaway as Narek (season 1) a Romulan agent sent to seduce and spy on Soji Asha
 Michelle Hurd as Rafaella "Raffi" Musiker: Picard's former Starfleet first officer who struggles with substance abuse
 Santiago Cabrera as Cristobal "Chris" Rios (seasons 1–2): a former Starfleet officer and the pilot of La Sirena. Cabrera also portrays the emergency holograms aboard La Sirena. During the second season, Rios falls in love with a 21st century woman and opts not to return to the future.
 Evan Evagora as Elnor (seasons 1–2): a Romulan refugee whom Picard abandoned as a boy and was raised by the Qowat Milat, a sect of all-female warrior nuns
 Jeri Ryan as Seven of Nine: a former Borg drone and crew member aboard the USS Voyager who became a member of the Fenris Rangers vigilante group
 Orla Brady as Laris and Tallinn: Laris is Picard's Romulan housekeeper who develops romantic feelings for him. Tallinn is a Supervisor like the Star Trek: The Original Series character Gary Seven.
 Brent Spiner as Data, Altan Inigo Soong, Adam Soong, and Lore: Data is Picard's former android lieutenant commander, created by cyberneticist Dr. Noonian Soong. Altan Inigo Soong is the latter's descendent and Dr. Adam Soong his ancestor from 2024, continuing the franchise's tradition of having Spiner play every male member of the Soong family. The android Lore is Data's evil older brother.
 Ed Speleers as Jack Crusher (season 3): the son of Beverly Crusher and Jean-Luc Picard

Production

Development
In June 2018, after becoming sole showrunner of the series Star Trek: Discovery, Alex Kurtzman signed a five-year overall deal with CBS Television Studios to expand the Star Trek franchise beyond Discovery to several new series, miniseries, and animated series. One of these new series was reported to star Patrick Stewart, reprising his role of Jean-Luc Picard from the series Star Trek: The Next Generation. Kurtzman and Akiva Goldsman (who worked on the first season of Discovery) were attached to the project. When CBS had first approached him about making more Star Trek series, Kurtzman included a series featuring Picard on his wish list as he believed the character was the greatest Star Trek captain. This was despite Stewart having previously said that he did not want to return to the franchise.

While developing ideas for the short form companion series Star Trek: Short Treks, Kurtzman and his team developed a story that would have featured Nichelle Nichols reprising her role from Star Trek: The Original Series as Uhura. The short would have seen a young Picard visit Uhura in hospital and receive a mission related to the Borg. The short did not move forward, but it led to discussions of a short starring Stewart as an older version of Picard. The team soon decided that they had enough material to pitch a full series focused on the character to Stewart. Kurtzman and Goldsman contacted the actor before January 2018 to discuss this idea, and met with him along with Discovery writer Kirsten Beyer at the Beverly Wilshire Hotel. Stewart took the meeting with the intention of turning the project down, but after Beyer convinced him to reconsider he agreed to read a four-page document outlining their ideas. At that time, Goldsman invited novelist Michael Chabon, a friend, to work on the project as well and the four ultimately produced a 35-page document that they sent to Stewart. Stewart asked to meet with the group again in March 2018, where he expressed his approval of their pitch. Stewart said the pitch felt like "something very unusual, and I was intrigued". While deciding whether to join the project, Stewart asked Kurtzman that the series be "so different" from previous Star Trek stories, "both what people remember but also not what they're expecting at all, otherwise why do it?"

On August 4, 2018, Stewart made a surprise appearance at the annual Las Vegas Star Trek Convention to officially announce the series and confirm that he would star in it. He explained that after last portraying the character in the 2002 film Star Trek: Nemesis, he felt his role in the franchise "had run its natural course", but in the years since he was humbled by stories of the impact the character had on the lives of fans. He was now happy to bring back Picard's "comforting and reforming light [to] shine on these often very dark times". In addition to starring, Stewart was also set to executive produce the series alongside Kurtzman, Goldsman, Chabon, Discoverys James Duff, Heather Kadin of Kurtzman's production company Secret Hideout, and Rod Roddenberry (the son of Star Trek creator Gene Roddenberry) and Trevor Roth of Roddenberry Entertainment, with Beyer as supervising producer.

The series was initially expected to premiere in 2019. Kadin revealed in October that it was intended to be ongoing rather than a limited miniseries and said that its release dates would not overlap with Discovery or any other new Star Trek series. Kurtzman added that the Picard series would be "its own thing", later elaborating that where Discovery is "a bullet", the Picard series is "a very contemplative show" with its own rhythm and more of a real-world feeling. CBS CCO David Nevins confirmed in December 2018 that the series was intended to debut on CBS All Access at the end of 2019, after the full release of Discoverys second season and several Star Trek: Short Treks shorts. Stewart revealed a month later that the series would consist of 10 episodes, and reiterated that the intention was for it to continue for multiple seasons, adding in February that "we are set up for possibly three years of this show". A production listing in March gave the series' title as Star Trek: Destiny, which CBS had trademarked in 2018. However, the official title was announced to be Star Trek: Picard at CBS's upfront presentation that May. At that time, Kurtzman said the series was being "shepherded" by a larger creative team rather than having a traditional showrunner.

Chabon was named sole showrunner in June, working on the day-to-day production with Kurtzman and Goldsman. A month later, the series was scheduled to premiere in January 2020. It was reported to have a budget of $8–9 million per episode. In October, Kurtzman said a second season was "already in the works". Chabon signed an overall deal with CBS Television Studios in early December to create several new series for the studio, which meant he would be exiting as showrunner of Picard in 2020. He remained an executive producer and writer for the series. CBS officially announced the second season a month later and revealed that Terry Matalas had joined the series as an executive producer to fill the void that would be created by Chabon's departure. Goldsman and Matalas took over as co-showrunners once Chabon left. The series was also reported to have an informal green-light for a third season that would be developed at the same time as, and filmed back-to-back with, the second. This was to save costs and simplify scheduling, and was officially confirmed in September 2021. By then, CBS All Access had been expanded and rebranded as Paramount+. Goldsman said the producers had discussed a three-season plan and a five-season plan for the series, but would ultimately keep making it as long as Stewart was happy to do so. In February 2022, Goldsman confirmed that the third season would be the last. Matalas served as sole showrunner for the third season.

Writing
Kurtzman's mandate for the series was that it be a psychological character study about Picard in his "emeritus years". He noted that it was rare for a television series to star an actor of Stewart's age. Goldsman said the series would not be a direct sequel to The Next Generation and would be more character-focused than that series, describing Picard as "slower, more gentle, more lyrical" than previous Star Trek stories. He contrasted Picard with Discovery by describing the latter as a sci-fi action-adventure series while Picard is a sci-fi drama series that tells dramatic stories within an otherworldly setting. Stewart was assured by the creative team that the series would not be "jokey", and compared Picard to when he reprised his X-Men role of Professor X in the film Logan (2017), where he was the same character but the franchise's world and tone was "blown apart".

Goldsman said each season tells a separate story, but he saw the three seasons as being "of a piece". Matalas elaborated that the series was a three-part story about Picard, with each season exploring different aspects of the character. In addition to having different stories and themes, each season also has a different tone and visual approach, making the series "a kind of an anthology" with each season following the respective visions of Chabon, Goldsman, and Matalas. The first season finds Picard deeply affected by the death of his android colleague Data in Nemesis, and Kurtzman saw it as a redemption story for the character, who must face the consequences of his choice to abandon Starfleet and the Romulans following the destruction of the planet Romulus in the film Star Trek (2009). The second season continues to explore issues that come up in the last stage of a person's life, especially Picard's past relationships, and other elements of his life that have been preventing him from moving forward. Goldsman felt that the first season was about resurrection and the second season was about redemption, while Matalas said the third season was designed to be a "send off" for Picard and the rest of Next Generation main cast.

Casting

With the series announcement in August 2018 came confirmation that Stewart would star as Picard. At the start of March 2019, Santiago Cabrera and Michelle Hurd were both set to co-star in the series, with Cabrera being one of the most sought-after actors during the 2019 television pilot season and choosing this series over other offers. Later that month, newcomer Evan Evagora was cast in another series regular role. In April, Alison Pill, Harry Treadaway, and Isa Briones joined the cast. Characters for the new cast members were announced in July, with Pill as Agnes Jurati, Cabrera as Cristobal "Chris" Rios, Hurd as Raffi Musiker, Treadaway as Narek, and Evagora as Elnor. Briones portrays several androids, including Dahj and Soji Asha.

While developing the series, the creative team discussed not bringing back any other characters from The Next Generation to allow Picard to stand alone and not become reliant on nostalgia. Part of this was to allow newcomers who had not seen the previous series to enjoy Picard. However, the writers wanted to be respectful to longtime fans of Star Trek and felt they were missing opportunities by not including certain characters, so they decided to add some returning guests who organically served the new story. Several actors from previous Star Trek series were announced as guest stars for Picard in July 2019, including The Next Generations Brent Spiner as Data, Jonathan Del Arco as Hugh, Jonathan Frakes as William Riker, and Marina Sirtis as Deanna Troi, as well as Star Trek: Voyager Jeri Ryan as Seven of Nine. In January 2020, Stewart said it was his hope that all of the main cast of The Next Generation would appear on Picard before the end of the series, while Kurtzman said if Michael Dorn reprised his Klingon role Worf in Picard he would appear as he did in The Next Generation and not be changed to match the new Klingon designs in Discovery. At that time, Whoopi Goldberg agreed to appear in the second season of the series as her The Next Generation character Guinan.

In June 2020, the main cast was confirmed to be returning for the second season, except for Treadaway. In April 2021, Ryan, Spiner, and first season guest star Orla Brady were revealed to also be main cast members for the second season, with John de Lancie appearing as his Star Trek character Q. That July, Voyager Robert Duncan McNeill said he had been in discussions to reprise his role as Tom Paris for both seasons of the series, but scheduling conflicts had prevented this. In April 2022, the main cast of The Next Generation were confirmed to be starring in the third season with Stewart: LeVar Burton as Geordi La Forge, Dorn, Frakes, Gates McFadden as Beverly Crusher, Sirtis, and Spiner. Another Next Generation cast member, Wil Wheaton, appeared in the second-season finale, reprising his role as Wesley Crusher, but did not return for the third season. After the second-season finale's release in May 2022, Ryan and Hurd confirmed that they had returned for the third season, but Cabrera, Pill, Evagora, and Briones did not. In January 2023, Ed Speleers was announced as a new series regular for the third season. He portrays Jack Crusher, the son of Picard and Beverly Crusher.

Design
Several members of the design team from Star Trek: Discovery returned for Picard, including production designer Todd Cherniawsky and creature designer Neville Page of Alchemy Studios. Christine Bieselin Clark served as costume designer. Acknowledging that the series would be set further in the future than any previous Star Trek film or series, Kurtzman explained that the production was aiming for a "grounded" approach rather than having things like "crazy floating skyscrapers and all the cliches of science fiction". The opening title sequence was created by Prologue, the company that created the Discovery opening sequence.

Filming
The series was filmed at Santa Clarita Studios, California, under the working title Drawing Room. It received large tax credits from the California Film Commission for the production to take place in California, rather than in Toronto, Canada, where Star Trek: Discovery is filmed. Filming for the first season took place from April to September 2019, with location shooting around California, including at Sunstone Winery in Santa Ynez Valley to depict Picard's French vineyard, at long-time Star Trek filming location Vasquez Rocks in the Sierra Pelona Mountains in Los Angeles County for Raffi's home, and in the Malibu area for the planet Coppelius.

Despite reports that the second and third seasons were intended to be filmed back-to-back, the producers were just planning to film the second season on its own when the COVID-19 pandemic began to impact film and television productions in early 2020. Due to the scheduling requirements for the series, the subsequent pandemic-induced delays meant the second and third seasons did need to be filmed back-to-back. Filming for the second season began in February 2021, with some third-season scenes being filmed at the same time. Location filming took place around Los Angeles for the second season, which is mostly set in that city during the year 2024. Filming for the season ended in September, with the production then segueing fully into filming the third. The two seasons had one of the largest television series crews at the time with more than 450 crewmembers. Filming for the series wrapped in March 2022; Stewart stated that continually filming the series for nearly 14 months was "thrilling and exciting much of the time", but also difficult for the actor who was in his 80s.

Visual effects
Visual effects for the series are provided by Pixomondo, DNEG, Crafty Apes, Ghost VFX, Gentle Giant Studios, Technicolor VFX, and Filmworks/FX. with Jason Zimmerman returning from Discovery as visual effects supervisor. Pixomondo worked with the series' production design department to help flesh out their designs into 3D assets, and then shared those assets with the other vendors. For the first season, these digital models included the Borg Cube, La Sirena, and the Romulan ships.

Music
Star Trek: Discovery composer Jeff Russo was revealed to be composing the score for Picard in July 2019. Russo's relationship with Star Trek began as a fan of The Next Generation, and he asked Kurtzman if he could work on Picard after seeing Stewart's announcement of the series at the Las Vegas Star Trek Convention. Russo wanted his music to remain truthful to previous Star Trek scores without repeating them, and especially wanted to avoid his music for Discovery. Russo felt that Picard was a more intimate story and wanted to take a more personalized approach by featuring more solo instrument performances than he did for Discovery.

Russo wrote several iterations of the main theme for the series before settling on a more emotional and stirring version. It is bookended with a piccolo, which Russo felt sounded similar to the fictional Ressikan flute that Picard played in the Next Generation episode "The Inner Light". The second season features an "up-tempo rearrangement" of the main theme. Additionally, Russo used Jerry Goldsmith's theme from Star Trek: The Motion Picture (1979) to connect to The Next Generation, as that series used Goldsmith's theme for its main title, and he also referenced Alexander Courage's original Star Trek theme to "evoke the idea of Star Trek in general". A soundtrack album for the first half of the first season was released on February 7, 2020, followed by an album for the full season on April 3. An album for the second season was released on April 29, 2022.

Stephen Barton replaced Russo as composer for the third season, after working with Matalas on the series 12 Monkeys. They took inspiration from the work of Goldsmith and James Horner for the Star Trek films. Craig Huxley contributed performances on the blaster beam, an instrument that he invented and previously played on the soundtrack of The Motion Picture.

Release

The first season of Star Trek: Picard was released on the streaming service CBS All Access in the United States. Like Discovery before it, each episode of the series is broadcast in Canada by Bell Media on the same day as the All Access release, on the specialty channels CTV Sci-Fi Channel (English) and Z (French) before streaming on Crave. Amazon Prime Video streams the episodes within 24 hours of their U.S. release in over 200 other countries and territories around the world; this is separate from Discovery, which was released internationally by Netflix at that time. The deals with Amazon and Bell were made by international distributor arm CBS Studios International.

After CBS All Access was rebranded Paramount+, the first season remained on the service and the other seasons were confirmed to be released on it as well. In February 2023, Paramount made a new deal with Prime Video for the series' international streaming rights. This allowed the third season to be streamed on Paramount+ in some other countries, within 24 hours of each episode's U.S. debut, alongside its Prime Video release. The first two seasons were also added to Paramount+ internationally in addition to remaining on Prime Video.

Reception

Viewership
A week after the series premiere, CBS said that Picard had set a new record for the total streams of a CBS All Access original series by its subscribers, with 115 percent more total streams than the previous record set by Star Trek: Discovery. CBS also partly attributed the premiere of the series for the month of January 2020 breaking the service's record for the most new subscribers in a month, helped by the week of Picards premiere being the second-most new subscribers in a single week for the service.

Critical response
{{Television critical response
| series            = Star Trek: Picard

| link1             = Star Trek: Picard (season 1)#Critical response
| rotten_tomatoes1  = 86% (254 reviews)
| metacritic1       = 76 (27 reviews)

| link2             = Star Trek: Picard (season 2)#Critical response
| rotten_tomatoes2  = 85% (95 reviews)
| metacritic2       = 69 (7 reviews)

| link3             = Star Trek: Picard (season 3)#Critical response
| rotten_tomatoes3  = 100% (51 reviews)
| metacritic3       = 84 (15 reviews)
}}
Star Trek: Picard has a 90% approval rating on the review aggregator website Rotten Tomatoes, while Metacritic, which uses a weighted average, has assigned a score of 77 out of 100 based on reviews from 48 critics, indicating "generally favorable reviews".

For the first season, Rotten Tomatoes reported an 86% approval score with an average rating of 7.55/10 based on 254 reviews. The website's critical consensus reads, "Anchored by the incomparable Patrick Stewart, Picard departs from standard Starfleet protocol with a slower, serialized story, but like all great Star Trek it tackles timely themes with grace and makes for an exciting push further into the final frontier." Metacritic assigned a score of 76 out of 100 based on reviews from 27 critics, indicating "generally favorable reviews". 

Rotten Tomatoes reported an 85% approval score for the second season, with an average rating of 7.95/10 based on 95 reviews. The website's critical consensus reads, "Picard gets some backup from franchise fan favorites in a sophomore season that charts a course towards recapturing more of the classical Star Trek spirit and makes it so." Metacritic assigned a score of 69 out of 100 based on reviews from 7 critics, indicating "generally favorable reviews". 

For the third season, Rotten Tomatoes reported a 100% approval score with an average rating of 8.6/10 based on 51 reviews. The website's critical consensus reads, "Finally getting the band back together, Picard final season boldly goes where the previous generation had gone before—and is all the better for it." Metacritic assigned a score of 84 out of 100 based on reviews from 15 critics, indicating "universal acclaim".

Accolades

Tie-in media

Publishing
In September 2019, CBS announced a novel written by frequent Star Trek author Una McCormack to be published by Simon & Schuster in February 2020. Titled The Last Best Hope, the novel introduces several characters from the first season and leads directly into its events. A three-issue comic book titled Star Trek: Picard – Countdown was also set to be released beginning that November by IDW Publishing. Written by Mike Johnson and Picard supervising producer Kirsten Beyer, the comic is set in 2385, and depicts Admiral Picard's actions during the evacuation of Romulus. A second novel, Dark Veil by James Swallow, was published in January 2021 and follows Riker and Troi aboard the USS Titan a year after Picard retires from Starfleet. Rogue Elements by John Jackson Miller was released in August 2021 and tells the backstory of Cristóbal Rios. 

Another three-issue comic by Johnson and Beyer, Star Trek: Picard – Stargazer, is set between the second and third seasons. Published by IDW beginning in August 2022, it features art by Angel Hernandez and tells a story in which Picard returns to helm the USS Stargazer. McCormack's second Picard novel, Second Self, centers on Raffi Musiker between the first and second seasons. It was released in September 2022.

Aftershows

The Ready Room

In January 2020, CBS All Access announced that The Next Generation actor Wil Wheaton would host a new season of the Star Trek aftershow The Ready Room, to stream after the release of each Picard episode. Wheaton replaced Naomi Kyle, who hosted the series for its first run after episodes of Discoverys second season.

Official podcast
After the series premiere on January 23, 2020, Deadline Hollywood released the first episode of the Star Trek: Picard Podcast, a weekly podcast sponsored by CBS All Access and hosted by Deadlines senior editor Dominic Patten and genre editor Geoff Boucher. Each episode of the podcast features interviews with the series' cast and creative team.

Audio drama
Simon & Schuster announced an audio-exclusive story, titled No Man's Land, in January 2022. Written by Kirsten Beyer and Mike Johnson, the story is set after the series' first-season finale and follows the characters Raffi and Seven of Nine, with Michelle Hurd and Jeri Ryan reprising their respective roles from the series. Fred Tatasciore, John Kassir, and John Cutmore-Scott also star in the drama, which was released on February 22, 2022.

Spin-offs

Star Trek: Short Treks

When the first season of the Discovery companion series Star Trek: Short Treks was being released in December 2018, CBS CCO David Nevins said there would be more shorts released before the premiere of Picard. In February 2019, Kurtzman said future shorts could tie directly into series other than Discovery. At San Diego Comic-Con 2019, Kurtzman announced that the second season of Short Treks would include a "teaser" for Picard set 15 years before the start of the series. Titled "Children of Mars", the short was released on January 9, 2020, and depicts the synthetic attack on Mars from Picards backstory from the perspective of two school children.

Other
In January 2022, Goldsman said there were elements of Picard that could be explored more in a spin-off series, and Matalas expressed interest in continuing to explore the time period of the series beyond its three seasons. He added that, in his opinion, Picard was the "present day of Star Trek. And what's going on in that particular world is very important to me." By May, some fans had begun championing the idea of a spin-off series starring Jeri Ryan as Seven of Nine and Michelle Hurd as Raffi. Matalas said he was "not just supporting, [but] spearheading" the idea, which both actresses also expressed interest in.

Frakes stated in November that the series was "ripe for a continuation of some version of what we've established in the show. Not more Picard, but certainly, Next Gen is alive and well." McFadden added that the Next Generation cast were excited to continue in their roles after working on the third season, and Stewart suggested the idea of making another Star Trek film with the cast. In contrast, Burton said he would be happy if he did not return to his role after the third season because he felt it "put a period at the end of this sentence and close[d] the book" on the character. In January 2023, Kurtzman said it was possible for the series to continue beyond the third season. Later that month, Frakes stated his opinion that a new Star Trek film was unlikely to be made and television was the future of the franchise. He said the third season had clear setup for a new series that continued the Next Generation story. The next month, Matalas reiterated that the third season of Picard would feel like "the final voyage of the Next Gen cast" but a "Next, Next Generation" series could continue with some legacy characters from The Next Generation, Deep Space Nine, and Voyager. He suggested the possible title Star Trek: Legacy and said such a series was not in development, but he would love to be involved if it ever was.

Notes

References

External links

 
 Star Trek: Picard on Paramount+
 
 

 
2020 American television series debuts
2020s American drama television series
2020s American science fiction television series
2020s American LGBT-related television series
American sequel television series
American television spin-offs
Paramount+ original programming
English-language television shows
Picard
Star Trek: The Next Generation
Television shows based on works by Gene Roddenberry
Television series by CBS Studios
Television series created by Akiva Goldsman
Television series created by Alex Kurtzman
Television series set in 2024
Television series set in the 24th century
Television series set in the 25th century
Television shows filmed in Los Angeles
Television shows set in France
Television shows set in Los Angeles
Television shows set in San Francisco
Television series by Roddenberry Entertainment